Witulski is a surname. Notable people with the surname include:

Arthur Frank Witulski, American electrical engineer
Florian Witulski (born 1986), German journalist and photographer